NATO targets are a series of standard armoured targets defined by NATO designed to test the armour penetration of weapons. The purpose of the triple heavy target is to represent the difficulty a projectile would face in penetrating the skirt, roadwheel, and hull of a Soviet tank. 

They are defined as:

References

NATO Standardization Agreements
Targeting (warfare)